Dualphotography is the photography technique of simultaneously taking two photographs of one scene, thus capturing a scene from both sides of the photographic device at once. In other words, it is the practice of creating a photographic scene from two opposing or complementary sides of a single real-world situation. Dualphotography can be used to capture both the subject and the photographer simultaneously, or both sides of a geographical place at once, thus adding a supplementary narrative layer to that of a single image.

Specific types of dualphotography include back-to-back photography and portal-plane photography. Stereoscopy is a specific kind of dualphotography, and while it is technically similar and would be compatible with the term, the latter is seldom used for it.

Etymology

The word "dualphotography" is a combination of "dual" from the Latin root dualis (“two”) and the word "photography". Along these lines, the composite of two photos taken simultaneously from the same scene is called a "dualphotograph" or "dualphoto".

A related term is "bothie", coined by Nokia in 2017 to introduce their smartphones with front and rear cameras. A bothie in this case would be a photo captured through both cameras at the same time. The term is seldom used in English, dualphoto has gained more popularity being easier to pronounce and understand in other languages too.

Techniques

Back-to-back

Back-to-back dualphotography is done with two cameras taking pictures at 180 degrees opposition, thus excluding the photographer and camera from the scene. It has been popularized by smartphone apps, because smartphones typically have a camera in the front for selfies and another in the back for more traditional photographs. Triggering both cameras at the same time would allow the smartphone to capture dualphotos.

Sometimes two traditional cameras can also be attached together and mechanically synchronized to capture photos at the same time.

Portal-plane

Portal-plane dualphotography uses two distant cameras with GPS and gyroscopic abilities to capture dualphotos. The cameras are linked by means of wireless transmission and both client and server-side software. This technique effectively removes the space between the two cameras and creates a single scene between two geographical places with two photos being off-facing each other.

Equipment

Dualphotography requires a dualcamera. Modern smartphones with specific software can take dualphotographs, but hardware equipment, both digital and film-based can be found (usually custom built).

References 

Photographic techniques